Advanced Air Mobility (AAM) is the "emerging aviation ecosystem that leverages revolutionary new aircraft and a broad array of innovative technologies to safely, quickly, affordably, and sustainably move people and goods among local destinations to connect communities underserved by existing modes of transportation," according to the Advanced Air Mobility Institute.

AAM seeks to integrate Unmanned Aerial Systems (UAS) and sustainable aircraft like electric Vertical Take Off and Landing (eVTOLs) into the sovereign airspaces of nations throughout the world such as that of the United States and its National Airspace System (NAS). It requires the development of the physical infrastructure of vertiports as well as the evolution of the digital infrastructure of a highly automated framework of operations, i.e. UAS Traffic Management (UTM).

AAM is an overarching term that combines both Urban Air Mobility (UAM), which involves transporting persons and cargo above the traffic within a city, and Regional Air Mobility (RAM) which is focused more on connecting suburbs, villages and small towns in the countryside as well as islands or communities separated by mountainous regions and rivers.
Urban Air Mobility (UAM) promotes intra-city airborne transportation and constitutes the largest subset of AAM, along with Suburban Air Mobility, Rural Air Mobility, and Regional Air Mobility. While UAM has attracted the majority of attention and investment, the initial rollout of AAM operations will likely start in more remote, rural settings in order to minimize collateral damage in the event of a mishap. AAM includes and expands upon the principles of UAM into applications beyond the urban environment: 
 Intra-city airborne transportation
 Inter-city airborne transportation
 Cargo delivery
 Public services
 Private / Recreational vehicles

In February 2020, the National Academies of Sciences, Engineering, and Medicine, published a report that intentionally broadened the scope of the nascent UAM concept to address more than just midtown Manhattan use cases. Since March 2020, UAM is considered a key element of the bigger picture that the National Aeronautics and Space Administration (NASA) calls Advanced Air Mobility. Just four months later in July 2020, the Federal Aviation Administration (FAA) formalized use of the umbrella term, Advanced Air Mobility. According to a May 2021 market valuation by Morgan Stanley, AAM will be worth $1 trillion US dollars by 2040 and up to $9 trillion just a decade later. However, the consulting firm Drone Industry Insights whose primary focus is the commercial drone market provides a more conservative forecast of $20.8 billion by 2035 with a CAGR of 22.1%.

Brief History 
Aside from the origin of the term, it is difficult to pinpoint exactly when or where the spirit of Advanced Air Mobility first developed. A video depiction of a passenger-carrying eVTOL concept aircraft dubbed Puffin was shared online by NASA on November 11, 2009. A number of early eVTOL working prototypes garnered investment by Google co-founder Larry Page. In Fall 2016, Uber launched project Elevate to explore offering on-demand air transportation. Three years later, 'Uber Copter' services began in New York City (NYC) utilizing traditional helicopters, which was hardly novel but it did highlight two missing ingredients essential to AAM: Namely, a grassroots protest in NYC called Stop the Chop demanded that non-essential helicopter flights cease because they caused excessive noise pollution and air pollution.

NASA acoustic testing confirmed that AAM eVTOLs are "vastly quieter than helicopters" and as McKinsey aerospace expert, Kersten Heineke points out, "completely emission-free." Just as AAM was building momentum, the COVID-19 pandemic forced society into lockdown in 2020 and hampered growth throughout the emerging aviation market globally. However, it is worth noting that during this same period there was a substantial increase in the number and value of investments that companies in the eVTOL and drone delivery markets received.

International Efforts

China 
In 2019, Chinese manufacturer EHang had engaged in extensive passenger flight testing with autonomous eVTOLs. The Civil Aviation Administration of China is currently reviewing certification of their 'EH216-S' eVTOL aircraft model. Certification is projected to be complete in January 2023 which will likely make the 'EH216-S' the first unmanned, passenger-carrying eVTOL to operate in the world. As of December 19, 2022, EHang has earned an AAM Reality Index score of 8.1 making it the second most prepared eVTOL manufacturer.

Germany 
European multi-national corporation Airbus is collaborating with the University of Stuttgart and Diehl Aerospace to engage in research for their Air Mobility Initiative. In 2022, ILA Berlin hosted discussions on the future of UAS regulations. The Chinese subsidiary of Volkswagen announced plans to build AAM aircraft for wealthy customers in Beijing. German eVTOL manufacturers, Volocopter and Lilium Jet, rank tied for 3rd and tied for 4th in the world for the AAM Reality Index, respectively. Lilium plans to build the first American vertiport outside the City of Orlando, Florida.

Spain 
The Spanish National Academy of Police in Avila celebrated a successful public maiden flight of the 'EH216-S' by Chinese manufacturer EHang in December 2022, making Spain the first nation in the European Union to operate an eVTOL for public safety. Local UAV manufacturer Umiles Next tested its prototype 'Integrity3' and demonstrated competent collision-avoidance systems as part of a U-space initiative. According to the European Aviation Safety Agency (EASA), U-space includes "all the services required to ensure [UAVs] operate effectively, safely, and securely." Spanish multi-national corporation Ferrovial ranks tied 2nd in the world for AAM vertiport infrastructure readiness alongside Urban-Air Port in the UK and BETA in the US.

South Korea 
Supernal, a division of Hyundai Motor Group ranks tied for 9th in the world for the AAM Reality Index. American multi-national corporation Honeywell has agreed to integrate its 'Anthem' avionics solution into the Supernal flight deck. MintAir along with Jaunt Air Mobility, an American-Canadian subsidiary of AIRO Group, signed an eVTOL Letter of Intent to collaborate for the "safest air taxi configuration that is operationally efficient, quiet, and sustainable," according to MintAir CEO, Eugene Choi.

Brazil 
FlyBIS Aviation, a Brazilian Advanced Air Mobility start-up based out of Caxias do Sul, has teamed up with Eve Air Mobility, a division of Embraer, to ensure that mass transportation options are a "more accessible and cleaner experience," according to Co-Founder Gustavo Zanettini. In 2021, Eve signed a Memorandum of Understanding with Portuguese multi-national corporation EDP Group to share research for optimal charging techniques. Eve Air Mobility ranks 7th in the world among eVTOL manufacturers, according to the December 2022 AAM Reality Index.

Switzerland 
The mission of the UAM Association Switzerland is to "accelerate the transition... by connecting stakeholders and informing the public." Swiss Dufour Aerospace earned an AAM Reality Index score of 5.2 for its 'Aero3' aircraft.

Example of aerial mapping footage from a drone over the Swiss Alps:

Australia 
In 2022, the Australian Civil Aviation Safety Authority (CASA) set out a roadmap for safe integration of RPAs and eVTOL aircraft among commercial aviation and recreational aviation for the next decade. Victoria Economic Development minister, Tim Pallas, published his Advanced Air Mobility Industry Vision Statement with plans to engage with stakeholders in 2023. Infrastructure group, Skyportz, has been selected to build Australia's first vertiport in Melbourne. March 2026 will bring many spectators to Victoria for the Commonwealth Games so the state government's work now to foster a supportive AAM ecosystem is critical.

France 
Groupe ADP is the world's leading AAM vertiport infrastructure company with 4 locations already underway in Paris.
The Paris Region Advanced Air Mobility Alliance is seeking to reduce the environmental impact of mass transportation until the community reaches carbon-free aviation. French multi-national corporation Thales Group has agreed to integrate its custom avionics solution into the Eve Air Mobility flight deck. French start-up, Ascendance Flight Technologies, shows early promise ranking at 15th in the AAM Reality Index. The 2024 Olympic Games will present an opportunity to showcase Volocopter eVTOL air taxi flights.

Sweden 
Swedish start-up Heart Aerospace is pursuing the Regional Air Mobility market with its hybrid 'ES-30' aircraft and earned a modest 5.1 score in the AAM Reality Index. United Airlines is betting on the success of AAM as both a major customer and investor of Heart Aerospace, as well as Eve Air Mobility and Archer Aviation.

Japan 
In Fall 2021, Honda announced its plans to enter the hybrid eVTOL market and shortly thereafter Toyota decided to switch support from the local Japanese start-up SkyDrive to the American venture-backed company, Joby Aviation. The following year, SkyDrive secured a strategic partnership with Volatus Infrastructure to develop AAM vertiports. Japan and the MassDOT Aeronautics Division are the only non-European governmental bodies to commit to AAM principles as fellow UIC2 International City/Region Partners along with communities across 15 European nations. In Summer 2022, Tokyo hosted the inaugural International Advanced Air Mobility Expo and according to the President of Rolls-Royce Japan, Susumu Kaminaga, AAM provides "some really interesting opportunities for passengers to travel more freely." Soon Japan will host the World Expo 2025 in Osaka and they plan to orchestrate nearly 30,000 eVTOL air taxi flights to accommodate the incredible influx of international tourists.

Italy 
UrbanV announced its mission to be a global leader in Advanced Air Mobility by offering consistent intra-city airborne transportation from Fiumicino Airport to the center of Rome a full year in advance of the 2025 Jubilee celebration at The Vatican.

Canada 
The Canadian Advanced Air Mobility Consortium is bringing industry, academia, and government together to solve Advanced Air Mobility challenges over the next 20 years. Canadian simulation technology company CAE Inc. and Volocopter forged a strategic partnership to produce the world's first AAM pilot training curriculum. In just a few years Canada will jointly host the World Cup 2026 with tens of thousands of football hooligans descending upon stadiums in Vancouver and Toronto so having AAM solutions in place beforehand is ideal.

United Arab Emirates 
Construction will begin in Dubai in 2023 by Canadian vertiport infrastructure group,VPorts, for an Advanced Air Mobility Integrator Center. The first of its kind, the 'Integrator Center' will facilitate testing for new eVTOL aircraft.

United Kingdom 
Vertical Aerospace is the top British eVTOL manufacturer with an AAM Reality Index score of 7.2, tied for 8th in the world. Virgin Atlantic along with Cranfield University and other key partners from industry and academia have created the Advanced Mobility Ecosystem Consortium and earned a £9.5m grant by the UK's Future Flight Challenge. According to the World Economic Forum, the world's first operational vertiport opened in April 2022 in Coventry called Air-One.

United States 
Before the end of 2020, Joby Aviation acquired the rights to project Elevate and in August 2021, the company went public on the New York Stock Exchange. 2022 was an eventful year for Joby with a new eVTOL speed record, a prototype crash in rural California, achieving a milestone FAA Part 135 air service certification, and securing another major investor and strategic partner in Delta Air Lines. Joby, with an industry-leading AAM Reality Index score of 8.7, is joined by BETA Technologies (ARI 8.0), Archer Aviation (ARI 7.8), Wisk Aero (ARI 7.5), Elroy Air (ARI 7.4), Pipistrel (ARI 7.2), Alaka'i Technologies (ARI 6.2), and Overair (ARI 6.2) to round out the top ten best eVTOL manufacturers in the world for likelihood to reach operational service. The FAA plans to outline its path to fully operational air taxis before Summer 2023.

In collaboration with Urban Movement Labs, the City of Los Angeles (LA) hopes to be a model for other communities moving forward with the publication of a report, Integrating Advanced Air Mobility: A Primer for Cities, with lessons learned from the recent past and careful considerations for the near future. LA will host the 2028 Olympic Games and global expectations will be at its highest to provide safe, quick, affordable, and sustainable transportation and comprehensive Advanced Air Mobility public services to local residents and visitors alike.

Stakeholders 
Because the Advanced Air Mobility aviation ecosystem is so broad it seems easiest to organize the key players by the market segment they will primarily support, although there will undoubtedly be overlap in practice.

Intra-city airborne transportation 

 Joby Aviation
 EHang
 Volocopter
 Archer Aviation
 Lilium Jet
 Eve Air Mobility
 Wisk Aero
 Vertical Aerospace
 Airbus
 Supernal
 Jaunt Air Mobility

Note: For an in-depth look at various VTOL aircraft power sources, propulsion, and flight controls See Urban Air Mobility.

Inter-city airborne transportation 

 Heart Aerospace
 Electra Aero

Note: While Urban and Suburban Air Mobility utilize eVTOL aircraft within a greater metropolitan area, Rural and Regional Air Mobility utilize electric Short Take Off and Landing eSTOL aircraft because they are better suited for the longer duration flights between cities and remote destinations.

Cargo delivery 

 Pipistrel ex. Nuuva-v300
 BETA ex. ALIA-250c
 UPS Flight Forward ex. rapid drone delivery of medical supplies at Wake Forest University hospital
 Amazon ex. Prime Air drones promising "click to delivery" in under 1 hour

Public services 
 Fire Fighting ex. Scalable Traffic management for Emergency Response Operations (STEReO)
 Search & Rescue ex. FEMA and Homeland Security
 Air Ambulance ex. Airborne Motor Works
 Power Line Inspection ex. Xcel Energy
 Vaccine Delivery ex. the Indian subsidiary of Honeywell led a successful trial during the COVID-19 pandemic
 Beyond Visual Line of Sight (BVLOS) Safety Testing ex. Native American Choctaw Nation BEYOND Program

Private / Recreational vehicles 

 Boeing ex. Boeing Passenger Air Vehicle

Note: 'Last mile' Passenger Air Vehicles aka Personal Air Vehicles (PAVs) are a long-term goal of AAM intended to offer even greater convenience than the modern private car. PAVs will be highly automated and simple to operate unlike flying general aviation today which requires extensive training time and money to earn a pilot's license and an on-going investment to maintain currency.

Popular Culture 
Flying cars or hovering vehicles of some form have captured the imagination of science fiction fans for generations. In many ways, Advanced Air Mobility is the practical realization of those dreams.

 Back to the Future Part II
 Blade Runner
 The Fifth Element
 Spaceballs
 The Jetsons

Legislation

United States 
 Advanced Air Mobility Coordination and Leadership Act

References 

Aviation